Stenoscaptia fovealis is a moth in the subfamily Arctiinae first described by George Hampson in 1903. It is found in New Guinea.

References

Lithosiini